In Greek mythology, Imbrasus (Ancient Greek: Ιμβρασος or Ἴμβρασος Imbrasos) may refer to the following personages:

 Imbrasus, a river-god of the island of Samos. As one of the Potamoi, he was presumably the son of the Titans Oceanus and Tethys. Imbrasus' wife was the fairest of the nymphs, Chesias. Their daughter, Ocyrrhoe, was loved by Apollo.
 Imbrasus, the Thracian father of Asius and Peiros, one of the Trojan leaders during the Trojan War.

Notes

References 

 Athenaeus of Naucratis, The Deipnosophists or Banquet of the Learned. London. Henry G. Bohn, York Street, Covent Garden. 1854. Online version at the Perseus Digital Library.
 Athenaeus of Naucratis, Deipnosophistae. Kaibel. In Aedibus B.G. Teubneri. Lipsiae. 1887. Greek text available at the Perseus Digital Library.
 Homer, The Iliad with an English Translation by A.T. Murray, Ph.D. in two volumes. Cambridge, MA., Harvard University Press; London, William Heinemann, Ltd. 1924. . Online version at the Perseus Digital Library.
 Homer, Homeri Opera in five volumes. Oxford, Oxford University Press. 1920. . Greek text available at the Perseus Digital Library.
 Publius Vergilius Maro, Aeneid. Theodore C. Williams. trans. Boston. Houghton Mifflin Co. 1910. Online version at the Perseus Digital Library.
 Publius Vergilius Maro, Bucolics, Aeneid, and Georgics. J. B. Greenough. Boston. Ginn & Co. 1900. Latin text available at the Perseus Digital Library.

Potamoi